Parque Revolución is a public park in Guadalajara, in the Mexican state of Jalisco.

The park has a statue of Venustiano Carranza and another of Francisco I. Madero.

References

External links

 

Guadalajara, Jalisco
Parks in Jalisco